Only When I Laugh may refer to:

 Only When I Laugh (film), a 1981 film based on Neil Simon's play The Gingerbread Lady
 Only When I Laugh (TV series), a 1970s/1980s British sitcom
 Only When I Laugh (album), a 1973 album by Blue Mink
 Only When I Laugh (play), a play based on the sitcom by Eric Chappell
 Only When I Laugh, a book by Jim Backus and Henny Backus

See also
 Only When I Larf, a 1968 novel by Len Deighton
 Only When I Larf (film), a 1968 adaptation of Deighton's novel
 It Only Hurts When I Laugh (disambiguation)